Maria Jeanette Anna (Maartje) van Putten (born 5 July 1951, in Bussum) is a Dutch politician.

In her early 20s she was instrumental in shifting Dutch transport policy towards safer streets, with the lasting effect that the Netherlands has excellent cycle infrastructure.

She was a Member of the European Parliament (MEP) for the Dutch Labour Party (PvdA) between 1989 and 1999, in which she was committed to the protection of nature and environment in developing countries. 

She later served as a member of the World Bank's Inspection Panel and wrote her PhD thesis on accountability mechanisms. She is a member of the Independent Review Mechanism of the African Development Bank (AfDB), and CEO of Global Accountability.

References

1951 births
Living people
People from Bussum
Labour Party (Netherlands) MEPs
MEPs for the Netherlands 1989–1994
MEPs for the Netherlands 1994–1999
20th-century women MEPs for the Netherlands